Caroline Jack (born 29 July 1978 in Port Elizabeth) is a field hockey goalkeeper from South Africa, who represented her native country at the 2004 Summer Olympics in Athens. There the women's national team finished in ninth position.

Jack's hometown is Grahamstown. Her maiden name is Birt and therefore she is nicknamed Birty. She plays for a provincial team called Southern Gauteng. Her international debut for South Africa was in 1998, during the Africa Cup in Harare.

International Senior tournaments
 2002 – Champions Challenge, Johannesburg
 2002 – Commonwealth Games, Manchester
 2002 – World Cup, Perth
 2003 – All Africa Games, Abuja
 2003 – Afro-Asian Games, India
 2004 – Olympic Games, Athens
 2005 – Champions Challenge, Virginia Beach
 2006 – Commonwealth Games, Melbourne
 2006 – World Cup, Madrid, Spain

References

External links

1978 births
Living people
South African female field hockey players
Female field hockey goalkeepers
Olympic field hockey players of South Africa
Field hockey players at the 2004 Summer Olympics
Sportspeople from Port Elizabeth
Field hockey players at the 2002 Commonwealth Games
Field hockey players at the 2006 Commonwealth Games
Commonwealth Games competitors for South Africa
People from Makhanda, Eastern Cape
African Games gold medalists for South Africa
Competitors at the 2003 All-Africa Games
African Games medalists in field hockey